Crimson Tide is a 1995 American action thriller film directed by Tony Scott and produced by Don Simpson and Jerry Bruckheimer. It takes place during a period of political turmoil in Russia, in which ultranationalists threaten to launch nuclear missiles at the United States and Japan.

The film focuses on a clash of wills between the seasoned commanding officer of a U.S. nuclear missile submarine (Gene Hackman) and his new executive officer (Denzel Washington), arising from conflicting interpretations of an order to launch their missiles. The story parallels a real incident during the Cuban Missile Crisis.

Hans Zimmer, who scored the film, won a Grammy Award for the main theme, which heavily uses synthesizers instead of traditional orchestral instruments. An extended cut, which incorporates seven minutes of deleted scenes, was released on DVD in 2006, while the 2008 Blu-ray release only includes the theatrical version.

Plot
An opening title card lists the three most powerful people on the planet: The U.S. President, the Russian President, and the captain of a U.S. nuclear submarine.

In post-Soviet Russia, civil war erupts as a result of the ongoing conflict in Chechnya. Military units loyal to Vladimir Radchenko, a Russian ultra-nationalist rebel, take control of a nuclear missile installation and threaten nuclear war if confronted.

USS Alabama, a U.S. Navy ballistic missile submarine, is dispatched on patrol with orders to launch a pre-emptive nuclear strike if Radchenko fuels his missiles. Combat-hardened veteran Captain Frank Ramsey is in command and chooses Lieutenant Commander Ron Hunter, who has an extensive education in military history and tactics but no combat experience, as his new XO.

Tensions arise between the headstrong Ramsey and the more analytical and cautious Hunter, exacerbated by Ramsey's decision to order a missile drill amidst the chaos caused by a galley fire that results in the death of the chief mess officer. Hunter helps fight the fire and discreetly questions the decision but is chastised by Ramsey for the appearance of discord.

Alabama receives an Emergency Action Message ordering missile launch against the Russian base. As Alabama prepares to fire, a second radio message is detected before a rebel Russian Akula-class submarine attacks, damaging the ship's radio and leaving the message incomplete.

With the last confirmed order being to launch, Ramsey decides to proceed. Hunter disagrees, believing the partial second message may be a retraction. When Hunter refuses to consent as is required, Ramsey tries to relieve him of duty. Hunter orders Ramsey arrested for attempting to circumvent two-man protocol. The crew's loyalty is divided between Hunter and Ramsey, but the Chief of the Boat sides with Hunter and has Ramsey relieved of command and confined to his stateroom, putting Hunter in charge.

The Russian submarine attacks Alabama again. The American vessel emerges victorious but is hit by a torpedo. The main propulsion system is disabled and the bilge bay begins flooding. As the crew tries to restore propulsion, Hunter orders the sealing of the bilge with sailors trapped inside, saving the ship at the expense of the men. Just before the submarine reaches hull-crush depth, propulsion is restored.

Officers and crew loyal to Ramsey unite and retake the control room, confining Hunter, the Chief of the Boat, and a few others to the officers' mess. Repairs to the radio continue, but Ramsey is determined to proceed without waiting for verification. Hunter escapes his arrest and stages a second mutiny. He gains the support of weapons officer Peter Ince in the missile control room, further delaying the launch and leading Ramsey to proceed to missile control. Hunter's party storms the ship's command center, removing the captain's missile key. Ramsey and his men return, resulting in an armed Mexican standoff. With news that the radio will soon be repaired, Ramsey and Hunter agree to wait until the deadline for a preemptive missile launch to be effective.

As they wait, Ramsey asks Hunter, who is African American, if he knows of the Lipizzan stallions, famed for their training and ability, pointing out that they are all white from Portugal. Hunter points out in response that they are born black and are from Spain. Ramsey acknowledges he didn't know about the birth color, but he was firm in the belief where they were from. Communications are restored, revealing the full message from the second transmission – a retraction ordering that the missile launch be aborted because Radchenko's rebellion has been quelled. Ramsey turns the conn over to Hunter and returns to his cabin.

The two men are put before a tribunal at Naval Station Pearl Harbor to answer for their actions. The tribunal concludes that both men were right and both men were wrong, and Hunter's actions were deemed lawfully justified and in the best interests of the United States. Unofficially, the tribunal reprimands both men for failing to resolve their differences. Thanks to Ramsey's personal recommendation, the tribunal agrees to grant Hunter command of his own sub while allowing Ramsey to save face via an early retirement with full honors. Outside, Hunter meets with Ramsey to express his gratitude, while Ramsey admits to Hunter he was right about the Lipizzan stallions being from Spain, as the two men part ways amicably.

A closing title card states that as of January 1996, authority to launch nuclear missiles is no longer within the power of a U.S. nuclear submarine captain, but rather the President of the United States.

Cast
 Denzel Washington as Lieutenant Commander Ron Hunter, Executive Officer (XO)
 Gene Hackman as Captain Frank Ramsey, Commanding Officer (CO)
 George Dzundza as Chief of the Boat Walters (COB)
 Matt Craven as Lieutenant Roy Zimmer, Communications Officer (COMMO)
 Viggo Mortensen as Lieutenant Peter Ince, Weapons Officer (WEPS)
 James Gandolfini as Lieutenant Bobby Dougherty, Supply Officer (SUPPO)
 Rocky Carroll as Lieutenant Darik Westergard, Operations Officer (OPS)
 Jaime P. Gomez as Officer of the Deck Mahoney (OOD)
 Michael Milhoan as Chief of the Watch Hunsicker (CPOOW)
 Scott Burkholder as Tactical Supervising Officer Billy Linkletter (TSO)
 Danny Nucci as Petty Officer Danny Rivetti, Sonar Supervisor
 Lillo Brancato, Jr. as Petty Officer Third Class Russell Vossler, Radio Operator
 Rick Schroder as Lieutenant Paul Hellerman, Damage Control Officer
 Steve Zahn as Seaman William Barnes
 Mark Christopher Lawrence as Leading Culinary Specialist Rono
 Ryan Phillippe as Seaman Grattam
 Eric Bruskotter as Bennefield
 Daniel von Bargen as Vladimir Radchenko, Russian ultra-nationalist leader
 Jason Robards as Rear Admiral Anderson (uncredited)
 Jim Reid Boyce as Diving Officer

Production

Development and writing
In 1993 the United States Navy allowed studio executives researching the movie to embark aboard Trident submarine  from Bangor, Washington, with the Gold Crew.  Those embarked included Hollywood Pictures president of production Ricardo Mestres, director Tony Scott, producers Jerry Bruckheimer and Don Simpson, screenwriter Michael Schiffer, and writer Richard Henrick.  While aboard, the Navy allowed the film crew to videotape Floridas Executive Officer, Lieutenant Commander William Toti, performing many of the same actions (Executive Officer's response to fire, flooding, missile launch sequence, etc.) that actor Denzel Washington eventually performed as executive officer in the movie.

The Navy had been led to believe that the movie's storyline was going to be about a Trident ballistic missile submarine crew attempting to stop the ship's fictional computer from launching nuclear missiles and starting World War III. In movie parlance, the Navy was told the story would be "The Hunt for Red October meets 2001: A Space Odyssey." The Navy wanted the Florida crew to prove to the studio executives that "there is no computer on a Trident submarine that can launch missiles, hence the storyline is implausible.

Following the at-sea walk-through and missile launch demonstration, Florida returned to port to drop off the studio executives. During that transit, Toti spent a great deal of time in the ship's wardroom with the studio executives, walking them through the missile launch redundancy procedures. A few months later, the studio returned to the Navy with the revised storyline, and the Executive Officer, Lieutenant Commander Hunter (the character played by Denzel Washington) was now leading a mutiny against the commanding officer to prevent a missile launch.

The film has uncredited additional writing by Quentin Tarantino, much of it being the pop-culture-reference laden dialogue. Tarantino had an on-set feud with Denzel Washington during filming over what was called "Tarantino's racist dialogue added to the script". A few years later Washington apologized to Tarantino saying he "buried that hatchet".

Filming
Filming took place in 1994. In the end, the Navy objected to many of the elements in the script—particularly mutiny on board a U.S. naval vessel—and as such, the film was produced without the Navy's assistance. The French Navy assisted the team for production with the use of the aircraft carrier . The dockside scene in which Captain Ramsey addresses the crew with Alabama in the background and the crew then runs on board actually features . The sail ("conning tower") was a plywood mock-up since Barbel's sail had been removed. Barbel had been sold by the U.S. Navy and was in the process of being scrapped.

Because of the Navy's refusal to cooperate with the filming, the production company was unable to secure footage of a submarine submerging. After checking to make sure there was no law against filming naval vessels, the producers waited at the submarine base at Pearl Harbor until a submarine put to sea. After a submarine (coincidentally, the real USS Alabama) left port, they pursued it in a boat and helicopter, filming as they went. They continued to do so until she submerged, giving them the footage they needed to incorporate into the film.

Music
The musical score for Crimson Tide was composed by Hans Zimmer, and employs a blend of orchestra, choir and synthesizer sounds. It includes additional music by Nick Glennie-Smith, who also conducted the orchestra, and the choir was conducted by Harry Gregson-Williams. It was released on physical formats on May 16, 1995, by Hollywood Records. Within the score is the well-known naval hymn, "Eternal Father, Strong to Save". The score won a Grammy Award in 1996 for Best Instrumental Composition Written for a Motion Picture or for Television, and Zimmer has described it as one of his personal favorites.

Reception

Box office
Crimson Tide earned $18.6 million in the United States on its opening weekend, which ranked #1 for all films released that week. Overall, it earned $91 million in the U.S. and an additional $66 million internationally, for a total of $157.3 million.

Critical reception
The film received mostly positive reviews from critics. Review aggregator Rotten Tomatoes reports that 89% of 53 critics have given the film a positive review, with a rating average of 7.5/10. The consensus reads, "Boasting taut, high energy thrills and some cracking dialogue courtesy of an uncredited Quentin Tarantino, Crimson Tide finds director Tony Scott near the top of his action game." Audiences polled by CinemaScore gave the film an average grade of "A" on an A+ to F scale.

Roger Ebert of the Chicago Sun-Times wrote, "This is the rare kind of war movie that not only thrills people while they're watching it, but invites them to leave the theater actually discussing the issues," and ultimately gave the film three-and-a-half stars out of four. Meanwhile, Mick LaSalle of the San Francisco Chronicle wrote, "Crimson Tide has everything you could want from an action thriller and a few other things you usually can't hope to expect."

Owen Gleiberman of Entertainment Weekly wrote that, "what makes Crimson Tide a riveting pop drama is the way the conflict comes to the fore in the battle between two men. ... The end of the world may be around the corner, but what holds us is the sight of two superlatively fierce actors working at the top of their game."

Awards
Crimson Tide was nominated for three Academy Awards, for Film Editing (Chris Lebenzon), Sound (Kevin O'Connell, Rick Kline, Gregory H. Watkins and William B. Kaplan) and Sound Editing (George Watters II).

Historical parallels
The film closely parallels events that occurred during the Cuban Missile Crisis onboard Soviet submarine B-59, with Denzel Washington's character reflecting Soviet second-in-command Vasily Arkhipov.

Influence
Robert S. Mueller, in his years as FBI Director, often quoted a line by Gene Hackman's character Captain Ramsey in his meetings with the senior leadership of the FBI: "We're here to preserve democracy, not to practice it."

References

External links

 
 
 

1995 films
1995 action thriller films
American action thriller films
Films about the military
Films about mutinies
Films about nuclear war and weapons
Films about the United States Navy
Films directed by Tony Scott
Films produced by Don Simpson
Films produced by Jerry Bruckheimer
Films scored by Hans Zimmer
Films set in 1994
Hollywood Pictures films
Films with screenplays by Quentin Tarantino
Submarine films
Films set in Washington (state)
Films set in Hawaii
Techno-thriller films
Films about coups d'état
1990s English-language films
1990s American films